Moliterno (Lucano: Mulitiernu) is a town and comune in the province of Potenza, in the southern Italian region of Basilicata. It is bounded by the comuni of Castelsaraceno, Grumento Nova, Lagonegro, Lauria, Montesano sulla Marcellana, Sarconi, Tramutola.

History
Tradition states that Moliterno was built after the destruction of Grumentum by the Saracens, which occurred between 872 and 975. Several Grumentini, who had  escaped the massacre,  settled around a tower built by the  Lombards. Moliterno was later a possession of  the Normans.

Main sights

Churches 
 Chiesa Madre, inside it houses the painting of The Deposition, attributed to the 17th-century painter Pietrafesa.
 Chiesa del Rosario
 Chiesa della Trinità
 Chiesa Santa Croce

Chapels
 Madonna del Carmine
 Chiesa Santa Barbara
 Cappella di San Pietro
 Chiesa di San Rocco
 Cappella dell' Angelo

See also
 Moliterno (cheese)

References

External links
Moliterno Genealogy(Marriages index 1866–1910, Selected Deaths 1866–1880)(Archived)

Cities and towns in Basilicata